Marie-Alphonsine Danil Ghattas (4 October 1843 – 25 March 1927) was a Palestinian Christian nun who founded the Dominican Sisters of the Most Holy Rosary of Jerusalem (the Rosary Sisters), the first Palestinian congregation. She was beatified by Archbishop Angelo Amato on behalf of Pope Benedict XVI in 2009.

On 6 December 2014 Pope Francis recognized a miracle that had been attributed to her intercession which was a requirement for her canonization. The date of her canonization was announced alongside others passed for canonization on 14 February 2015 and she was canonized on 17 May 2015.

Life
Born Soultaneh Maria Ghattas on 4 October 1843 to a Palestinian family in Jerusalem, she spent her whole life working among the poor of Palestine. When she was 14, Ghattas joined the Congregation of St. Joseph of the Apparition as a postulant. In 1862 after her vows, she was sent to teach catechism in Bethlehem. There she also established religious associations promoting devotion to Mary through the rosary.

In Bethlehem, she claimed several apparitions of Mary directing her to found a Palestine congregation known as the "Sisters of the Rosary". In 1880 seven young girls prepared by Joseph Tannous, priest of the Latin Patriarchate of Jerusalem, received the religious habit of the new foundation from the hands of Patriarch Bracco. That same year, Ghattas received a dispensation from Rome to leave the community of the Sisters of St. Joseph and entered the new congregation.  She received the habit from the hands of Bishop Pascal Appodia, Auxiliary and Patriarchal vicar, on the feast of Our Lady of the Rosary, 7 October 1883. On 7 March 1885, together with eight other sisters, she professed her final vows in the new order in the presence of the Latin Patriarch of Jerusalem, Vincent Bracco.

Ghattas dedicated her life to parish ministry and the care and education of Palestinian girls, and the community quickly grew. In 1886 she founded a school for girls in Beit Sahour. Then she was sent to Salt in Transjordan with three sisters, then in Nablus, before returning in Jerusalem because of her health. After having recovered, she went to the house of Zababdeh.
 
In 1917, she went to Ein Karem to found an orphanage in Ein Karem. She died there on the Feast of the Annunciation 25 March 1927.

Beatification
The rite of beatification was presided over by Archbishop Angelo Amato, Prefect of the Congregation for the Causes of Saints, and special envoy of Pope Benedict XVI, at a Mass celebrated by Patriarch Fouad Twal, Latin Patriarch of Jerusalem, on 22 November 2009 at the Church of the Annunciation in Nazareth.

Pope Francis approved a second miracle to her on 6 December 2014 and canonized her on 17 May 2015. The ceremony was attended by more than 2,000 Christian pilgrims from the Middle East and by Palestinian President Mahmoud Abbas. Four days before the canonization of Marie-Alphonsine Danil Ghattas, the Vatican announced a treaty that reaffirms Palestinian statehood by the Holy See. The members of the order she founded run schools, catechetical programs, clinics and orphanages throughout the Middle East.

See also
 Mariam Baouardy
 Palestinian Christians

References

External links

 Rosary Congregation 

1843 births
1927 deaths
Christian female saints of the Late Modern era
Dominican saints
People from Jerusalem
Ghattas family
19th-century venerated Christians
Beatifications by Pope Benedict XVI
Canonizations by Pope Francis
Palestinian Roman Catholic saints
Venerated Catholics by Pope John Paul II
People from Bethlehem
Mandatory Palestine people